Cassinelle is a comune (municipality) in the Province of Alessandria in the Italian region Piedmont, about  southeast of Turin and about  south of Alessandria.

Cassinelle borders the following municipalities: Cremolino, Molare, Morbello, and Ponzone.

Demographic evolution

References

Cities and towns in Piedmont